Florida House Bill 999, titled Public Postsecondary Educational Institutions, is pending Florida legislation relating to public universities within the state. Under the legislation, diversity, equity and inclusion (DEI) programs and certain college majors relating to DEI would be eliminated or heavily restricted; the legislation phrases such courses as being based on "unproven, theoretical, or exploratory content". The bill would prohibit state universities from including DEI and political identity filters within higher education hiring processes, and bans the usage of critical race theory in hiring. The bill was filed in the Florida House of Representatives on February 21, 2023, by Republican representative Alex Andrade, while a Florida Senate version, designated as SB 266 and given the title Higher Education, was filed seven days later by Republican state senator Erin Grall. 

The bill is seen by both supporters and opponents as part of the manifestation of Florida governor Ron DeSantis' wide-reaching educational proposals. The governor is expected to sign the bill if it passes both houses of the Florida legislature.  Akin to the Florida Parental Rights in Education Act (or the Don't Say Gay Act as described by opposition and protestors), HB 999 also received a massive amount of backlash from students, with protests beginning to be staged within days of its initial introduction into the Florida legislature. Protests occurred at many of Florida's largest universities.

Background 

Under DeSantis, Florida has seen a wide number of bills relating to restricting education in the state. The most notable of these bills was the Parental Rights in Education Act, a law which restricted the instruction of homosexuality, gender identity, and various other LGBT+ issues and content within public elementary schools up to third grade. The law was dubbed by critics and a very large opposition as the Don't Say Gay act (less commonly the Don't Say Gay or Trans act), and was the subject of massive protests (particularly by students) across the country. The law was additionally protested by organizations representing various groups of people, from lawyers to pediatricians, and received scrutiny from the US federal government and a United Nations-affiliated official on LGBT+ discrimination. The entertainment industry also heavily mobilized against the bill, with DeSantis and the Florida legislator retaliating against The Walt Disney Company in particular by repealing the Reedy Creek Improvement District, which houses Walt Disney World.

DeSantis' efforts have also been seen as one of his ways to counter the influence of former president Donald Trump. DeSantis is widely expected to challenge Trump in the 2024 Republican Party presidential primaries, and is seen by many outlets and commentators as the Republican Party nominee who could most likely defeat Trump's re-election bid. The former president has been attempting to counter DeSantis' sudden rise in popularity by making similar campaign promises in the field of education, announcing campaign promises to ban critical race theory and "bring back parental rights into our schools".

Provisions 
HB 999 would prohibit colleges from funding or backing any college programs or campus activities which support or "espouse" DEI. The bill bans courses “based on unproven, theoretical, or exploratory content,” leading critics to ask if that includes the theories explaining evolution, gravity, theoretical physics. It also would ban majors in studying under identity or women's history, as well as derivative majors from these ideas. Gender studies, critical race theory, and intersectionality would also all be prohibited from being taught as majors. The bill additionally recommends the rewriting of universities' mission statements.

The bill would empower the Florida public university system's Board of Governors to enforce the law as it sees fit; 14 of the 17 seats on the Board of Governors are appointed directly by Florida's state governor. Each individual university's board of trustees would further gain the ability to review faculty members' tenure at will.

Legislative history 
The house version of the bill has advanced the farthest so far in the Florida legislature. Its first reading occurred on March 7, 2023, and was favorably received by the Postsecondary Education and Workforce Subcommittee on March 13, which voted along party lines to advance the bill. The bill has yet to pass either house of the state legislature.

Support and opposition

Support 
DeSantis' office has backed the bill, saying that it is necessary to prevent colleges and higher education within the state of Florida from leaning too far towards the Democratic Party. A statement released by his office claims that backers to American liberalism "suppress free thought in the name of identity politics and indoctrination", and that a "course correction" is necessary.  Florida's education secretary Manny Diaz further backs the bill, claiming the administration he works under wishes that students learn to pursue the truth. Both Diaz and DeSantis alludes that the opposition to HB 999 intends to impose ideology or a whim ideology on students.

The National Review ran articles in support of the passage of the act, claiming that granting the ability for university boards to review faculty is a positive, and that the bill's mandates on civic education and the study of Western civilization are an improvement to the university curriculum. Stanley Kurtz argues that professors are promoting what he sees as an unnecessary fear of educating students on the Bill of Rights, the US Constitution, and the Federalist Papers. Kurtz further argues that stuff would mostly be the same under the faculty tenure review provisions, and that university presidential review would help to further the mission of the university.

Student protests 
Akin to Florida's Parental Rights in Education Act, students have been the most prominent demographic group opposed to the bill. Protests against the bill were noted to start almost immediately after the legislation was first introduced. Protests were first noted at Florida International University (FIU), Florida State University (FSU), the University of Florida (UF), and the University of South Florida (USF). A smaller protest was also staged at the University of Central Florida (UCF). and protests are additionally planned at Florida Atlantic University on March 15, 2023.

On March 7, 2023, at USF, students rallied and sat in outside a board of trustees meeting, to which the board seemed receptive to. The students outside dropped a banner off of a parking garage which read "stop house bill 999", and both outside and during the sit in, signs reading "Stop Death-Santis" and "Black Lives Matter" were held by students. Inside the board meeting, a letter signed by 30 university student organizations stated that the bill would restrict funding to an untold number of activities and organizations. The immediately previous Monday, the University of South Florida was also the site of a violent protest against the law staged by the Tampa Bay Students for a Democratic Society. Three students and one university employee were arrested during a march from the Marshall Student Center to the Patel Center for Global Solutions for "causing a loud disturbance" and battery of law enforcement. The students demanded to see university president Rhea Law, and police claimed that the protest turned into a physical altercation despite their attempts to deescalate.

In Tallahassee, Florida's state capital and the home of FSU, a protest against the bill was held on March 6 and organized by students, albeit carefully managed to avoid a repeat of the arrests from the USF. While mostly organized by students, FSU's Black Student Union and Women Student Union all supported the protest along with other groups who could potentially be deemed at risk. FSU students' protests were additionally supported by Democratic politicians serving in the Florida legislature. Many of the students at the protest expressed their opposition to the bill was rooted in either FSU's tradition for activism, the danger that the bill would pose to some groups' funding, or to protest the censorship of education. Students from other public Florida universities were noted to have travelled to Tallahassee to join the FSU protest.

Other opposition 
Legislators in the Florida legislature have raised alarm to line 341 of the bill in particular, the provision restricting public universities' use of funds to support DEI efforts. Democratic state representative Yvonne Hinson raises concern that the legislation would potentially impact the ability of black sororities to continue to function, despite the attempt of Andrade to calm her fears.

The American Council of Learned Societies raised its own protest against the bill and started an online petition signed by numerous organizations and students. The ACLS not only argues that the censorship presented under HB 999's passage would prevent learning, but that Florida universities would lose accreditation for federal funds and prevent numerous low-income students from attending college. Students from across the United States and the world have signed the petition, as have many organizations, including the American Historical Association, the College Art Association, and the Middle East Studies Association of North America. The American Historical Association further submitted its own protest letter signed by many of the same organizations.

Historians further expressed their opposition by criticizing the bill for effectively threatening academic freedom. Through its ban of critical race theory, the American Historian Association slammed the bill, as it is argued that teaching accurate American History is impossible without covering concepts related to slavery in the United States and America's history with racism.

References

External links 

 Full text of HB 999
 Full text of SB 266
2023 in Florida
2023 in American law
2023 in American politics
2023 controversies in the United States
2023 in education
Education in Florida
United States education law
Ron DeSantis